Newnham College Boat Club is the rowing club for members of Newnham College, Cambridge.  The club has a year-round senior squad and invites all members of the college to learn to row by joining the novice squads during Michaelmas or Easter terms.

In the Lent Bumps, the 1st VIII has rarely finished outside the top nine places, taking the headship in 1977, 1982, 1983, 2019 and 2022. In the May Bumps, the 1st IV and 1st VIII has never finished outside the top ten places, taking the headship in 1975, 1976, 2003, 2019 and 2022.

History
The club pioneered women's rowing at Cambridge University. It was founded in 1893, making it one of the oldest continuously existing all-women's rowing clubs in the world.

Newnham College Boat Club represented Cambridge in the Women's Boat Race from the inaugural race in 1927 until Cambridge University Women's Boat Club was founded in 1941 when Girton College became the second women's college to cater for rowing.  All of the Cambridge rowers in 1941 were members of Newnham. The following year, the first non-Newnham rower competed. The Cambridge victories in the early years, 1929 and 1930, were credited to Newnham College.

The first bumps races for women were held in 1974 and since then have continued to be major events in the club's calendar. In 1976 in the May Bumps, Newnham I were head on the 2nd day, and Newnham II were in 2nd position. No other women's club has managed to get a 2nd boat into 2nd place. The only men's club to have managed it was 1st Trinity, whose 2nd boat bumped its 1st boat in the 1875 races to finish in 2nd place behind Jesus. Newnham is, therefore, the only club (men or women) in the history of Cambridge bumps racing to have held the top two places simultaneously.

In 2006 Newnham won the newly inaugurated Pegasus Cup for being "the most successful college boat club competing in the Cambridge May Bumping Races", with a points system that takes into account the number of boats competing in the races, thus favouring smaller boatclubs. They reclaimed the Cup in 2017.

The May races in 2007 saw Newnham go up three places.

In 2009/10 Newnham won the Michell Cup, annually awarded by the CUCBC to the Boat Club giving the best performance on the river during the course of the academic year.  Newnham retained the trophy in 2010/11 and the upwards trajectory in the Bumps tables was continued in 2011/12 when the first VIII finished at 3rd on the river.

In 2013 Newnham won the newly inaugurated Marconi Cup for being "the most successful college boat club competing in the Cambridge Lent Bumping Races".

In 2019, Newnham claimed headship in both the Lent and May bumps, ending 's two-year reign by bumping them in both events. This was Newnham's first Lents Headship since 1983, their first Mays Headship since 2003, and their first ever Double Headship (meaning holding Head position in both the Lents and May Bumps in the same year). Additionally in the May Bumps 2019, Newnham II claimed "W2 Headship" position, being the highest ranked W2 on the river. Having lost the Lents headship in 2020, Newnham regained it in 2022 before losing it again in 2023.

Notes

References

 Durack, John; Gilbert, George; Marks, Dr. John (2000). The Bumps: An Account of the Cambridge University Bumping Races 1827-1999 
 CUCBC (various years) - Lent and May Bumps programmes.

External links
 Newnham College Boat Club
 CUCBC 

Rowing clubs of the University of Cambridge
Boat
Sports clubs established in 1893
1893 establishments in England
Rowing clubs in Cambridgeshire
Rowing clubs in England
Rowing clubs of the River Cam